Miss Granny is a 2014 South Korean comedy-drama film directed by Hwang Dong-hyuk. Na Moon-hee stars as a woman in her 70s who magically finds herself in the body of her 20-year-old self (Shim Eun-kyung) after having her picture taken at a mysterious photo studio. After opening in theaters on January 22, 2014, it became a huge box office hit, with 8.65 million tickets sold.

Plot
Oh Mal-soon, a 74-year-old widow, lives with her son and his family. Foul-mouthed, stubborn, controlling and shameless, she has a difficult relationship with her depressed daughter-in-law Ae-ja, but is very proud of her son Hyun-chul, who became a university professor of gerontology, and whom she raised by herself against all odds. One day, Ae-ja gets hospitalized after suddenly collapsing. Her doctors strongly advise her to live apart from Mal-soon. On the day she is told by her son that she is being sent to a nursing home, the dismayed Mal-soon wanders the streets and comes across a mysterious photo studio that claims it captures the moments of one's youth. She takes what she believes will be her last self-portrait for her not-so-far-off funeral, but when she comes out of the studio, Mal-soon is dumbfounded by her own reflection in the mirror: she's now a fresh, young 20-year-old woman.

At first not knowing what to do, she hides from her family and soon ends up lodging with her fellow café shop worker who used to be a servant of her family. With no one recognizing her, Mal-soon decides to make the most out of this once-in-a-lifetime opportunity. She renames herself Oh Doo-ri after her all-time favorite actress Audrey Hepburn, gets a haircut similar to Hepburn's in Roman Holiday, and takes advantage of her youth. As the "suspicious girl" of the Korean title, all anyone sees is that Doo-ri speaks with a regional accent and walks like an old lady, and that she acts very strangely and motherly for her age. After wowing a group of pensioners with a stirring karaoke tune one day, she attracts the notice of her unknowing grandson Ji-ha, a 4th year in university, and Han Seung-woo, a TV music producer. Ji-ha invites her to join his heavy metal band, and after she convinces them to switch to more audience-pleasing melodies.

She gets caught romantically between two men: Mr. Park, her now ex-café worker friend who had always secretly loved Mal-soon, and Seung-woo, who's doing his best to track her down again. Mr. Park's daughter forces her out as she thinks Doo-ri is scheming after his money and she takes refuge in Mr. Han's apartment.

Meanwhile, the band becomes successful with her as vocalist and Seung-woo decides to take them under his wing. Doo-ri is thrilled to be pursuing a career in music ― something she had to give up when she was young. They are booked for an extravaganza at the studio and Ji-ha is late due to a traffic jam. He decides to leave the taxi and bike but is hit by a lorry on the way there. He is in a critical condition at the hospital but Doo-ri decides to go on stage so as to tell him that his song was a success afterwards. As she arrives at the hospital it is found that only she has the correct blood type for a transfusion. She does the transfusion knowing that it would return her back to her aged condition.

Ji-ha's band takes off with the sister as the lead singer and Doo-ri as a fan. Mr. Park finds the same photo studio and becomes young. He picks her up at a bus stop and rides off bickering good naturedly as they always do.

Cast

Shim Eun-kyung as young Oh Mal-soon / Oh Doo-ri
 Na Moon-hee as Oh Mal-soon
Park In-hwan as Mr. Park
Sung Dong-il as Ban Hyun-chul
Lee Jin-wook as Han Seung-woo
Hwang Jung-min  as Ae-ja
Kim Seul-gi as Ban Ha-na
Jinyoung as Ban Ji-ha
Kim Hyun-sook as Park Na-young
Ha Yeon-joo as Soo-yeon 
Park Hye-jin as Ok-ja 
Jung In-gi as Hyun-chul's doctor friend
Hong Seok-yeon as chemist
Lee Jang-yu as shoe stall owner
Park Hyung-woo as bassist of Ji-ha's band
Lee Sang-eon as drummer of Ji-ha's band
Park Seung-tae as Oh Bok
Han Ji-eun as Seo Mi-ae 
Hwang Young-hee as Chinese restaurant owner
Kim Seon-ha as princess in TV drama
Kim Dong-hee as Dragon
Kim Dong-seok as music show MC
Pyo Ye-jin as music show MC
Kim Soo-hyun as young Mr. Park (cameo)
Hwang Seung-eon as female college student applying make-up (cameo)
Jang Gwang as photographer (cameo)
Choi Hwa-jung as radio DJ (cameo)
Yoo Se-yoon as legendary band vocalist (cameo)

Original soundtrack

Box office
Miss Granny was released in South Korea on January 22, 2014. It drew 850,000 admissions on its opening day, placing it second behind Hollywood animated film Frozen at the box office.

By its second week, good word of mouth caused ticket sales to rise 106%, and Miss Granny became the surprise chart topper after accruing 1.76 million viewers over the Lunar New Year weekend. After only 12 days in theaters, it reached close to 4 million admissions. To date, the film has had 8,656,417 admissions, earning ; it climbed to number 13 on the all-time Korean box office chart in its eighth week. Miss Granny grossed a total of  internationally.

Awards and nominations

Remakes
CJ E&M and Beijing Century Media co-produced a Chinese remake titled 20 Once Again, which was released on January 8, 2015. Directed by Leste Chen, it starred Yang Zishan, Gua Ah-leh, Chen Bolin, and Lu Han.

The Vietnamese remake titled Sweet 20, directed by Phan Gia Nhat Linh, was released on December 11, 2015.

The Japanese remake Sing My Life (Ayashii Kanojo or "Suspicious Girl") was co-financed by CJ E&M, Shochiku Films and Nippon TV, and produced by C&I Entertainment. Directed by Nobuo Mizuta and starring Mikako Tabe and Mitsuko Baisho, it was released on April 1, 2016.

In November 2016, it was announced that two remakes aimed at the North American market would be produced. One, in English, would be produced by Tyler Perry, and the other, in Spanish, by Eugenio Derbez.

A Thai remake titled Suddenly Twenty was released on November 24, 2016.

An Indonesian remake, entitled Sweet 20, was released on June 25, 2017.

In the Philippines, Viva Films secured the rights to do an adaptation through its partnership with CJ Entertainment, with Sarah Geronimo as the lead. James Reid was later cast as her grandson. It was released on August 22, 2018, also entitled Miss Granny.

A Telugu-language Indian remake, Oh! Baby, was released in 2019, while a Bollywood remake and a German remake are in development.

Television
A Chinese drama based on the film, Twenties Once Again, aired in 2018 with Hu Bingqing and Elvis Han as leads.

A Korean drama remake is in the works, and has cast Kim So-hyun as the lead.

See also
Mr. Back
17 Again

References

External links
 

An old mind in a young body: womanhood between oppression and expression in Miss Granny Feminist Media Studies

2014 films
South Korean comedy-drama films
CJ Entertainment films
Films about rapid human age change
South Korean films remade in other languages
2010s South Korean films